The 2007 Aaron's 499 was the ninth race of the 2007 NASCAR Nextel Cup Season, and was run on April 29, 2007, at Talladega Superspeedway in Talladega, Alabama.  This race was the second of the four restrictor plate races on the NASCAR schedule .

Jeff Gordon won this race to pass Dale Earnhardt on the all-time NASCAR list at 77 wins.  After he crossed the checkered flag, some spectators threw bottles, cans, and even toilet paper at the #24 car he drove for Hendrick Motorsports.  As a result of this incident, in spite of warnings before the race by NASCAR and organizers, a total of 14 people were arrested, and Talladega management revoked their ticket-buying privileges.  However, a loophole was later discovered through which these banned fans could buy tickets from third-party ticket brokers, such as StubHub. The race's other top finishers included Jimmie Johnson, Kurt Busch, David Gilliland, and Jamie McMurray in that order.

The race ended with an aborted green-white-checkered finish.  Several cars were involved, including Tony Stewart, Kevin Harvick, McMurray, and Gilliland.  Harvick and McMurray were later fined $25,000 and placed on probation for their actions during this accident. The finish had been triggered by an engine failure in the #00 car driven by David Reutimann.

Entry list

Qualifying 
In qualifying, both Jeff Gordon and David Gilliland would tie for having the same time. The pole was given to Jeff Gordon, who had more owners points.

Race recap

Race results
W
(*) denotes Rookie of the Year candidate.

Notes 
As mentioned, this was Gordon's 77th career win, which earned him sixth place all-time.  The day before, he won his 60th career pole position, which surpassed Darrell Waltrip for the most in NASCAR's modern era (since 1971).
Gordon won on the anniversary of Dale Earnhardt's birthday and on a track on which he and his son Dale Earnhardt Jr. have won a combined total of 15 Sprint Cup Series races.
Despite posting the 20th-best overall lap, Michael Waltrip missed his eighth straight Cup race.  That lap was only the eighth-fastest among those drivers having to qualify on time.   That would have been good enough to make the race, but Dale Jarrett, ironically a teammate at Michael Waltrip Racing, used a past champion's provisional, bumping Waltrip from the field.
Also missing from the field was Brian Vickers, who had been the most recent race winner at Talladega prior to this, at the 2006 UAW-Ford 500.
The #21 team owned by Wood Brothers/JTG Racing was absent from a Cup starting lineup for the first time since April 2000, also at Talladega.  Ken Schrader, Mark Martin, and Michael Waltrip had been the only three drivers to qualify for all restrictor-plate races since NASCAR first placed them on cars at certain tracks in 1987.  All those streaks ended that weekend (Martin was replaced in the #01 by Regan Smith).
Bill Davis Racing had a mixed weekend; Jeremy Mayfield made his first race outside of those using the Car of Tomorrow, but Dave Blaney missed his first race of the year.

References

External links
Complete race results
Points standings after this race

Aaron's 499
Aaron's 499
NASCAR races at Talladega Superspeedway
April 2007 sports events in the United States